Ban Huoeisay Airport  is an airport in Ban Houayxay, Laos. Alternative spellings are Ban Houayxay Airport, Ban Houei Sai Airport and Ban Huay Xai Airport.

Airlines and destinations

There are no scheduled flights to Ban Huoeisay Airport due to a runway upgrade.

Accidents and incidents
On 30 June 1971, Douglas C-47B XW-TDI of Royal Air Lao was written off in an accident at Ban Huoeisay Airport.

References

Airports in Laos
Buildings and structures in Bokeo province